The Frederica River is an  tidal river in Glynn County, Georgia. It forms the western boundary of Saint Simons Island of the Georgia Sea Islands.  Fort Frederica National Monument is located on the eastern bank of the river on Saint Simons Island.

See also
List of rivers of Georgia

References 

Rivers of Georgia (U.S. state)
Rivers of Glynn County, Georgia